Sangi is a Pakistani and Nivkh surname that may refer to the following notable people:
Ali Gul Sangi (1952–2014), Pakistani poet, author, political activist, and journalist
 Sohail Sangi (born 1953), Pakistani journalist and activist
 Vladimir Sangi (born 1935), Nivkh author, publisher, and language activist